is a railway station located in Nōgata, Fukuoka.

Lines 

Chikuhō Electric Railroad
Chikuhō Electric Railroad Line

Platforms

Adjacent stations

Surrounding area
 Nōgata Station
 Nōgata Post Office
 Fukuoka Prefectural Route 27
 Nōgata City Hall
 Nōgata Police Station
 Nōgata Tax Office
 Nōgata Pension Service
 Nōgatakita Elementary School
 Nōgata City Library
 Yamato Seiran High School
 7-Eleven
 Lawson
 FamilyMart

Railway stations in Fukuoka Prefecture
Railway stations in Japan opened in 1959